Štefan Haššík (25 November 1898 in Dlhepole — August 1985, Cleveland) was a Slovak politician who was the Minister of Defense of the Slovak State from 5 September 1944, replacing Ferdinand Čatloš who supported the Slovak National Uprising.

References

1898 births
1985 deaths
People from Bytča
Defence Ministers of Slovakia
Slovak emigrants to the United States
Slovak People's Party politicians